Folligny is a commune in the Manche department in north-western France. Folligny station has rail connections to Granville, Argentan, Caen, Paris and Rennes.

See also
Communes of the Manche department

References

Communes of Manche